The River Raisin National Battlefield Park preserves the site of the Battle of Frenchtown as the only national battlefield marking a site of the War of 1812. It was established as the 393rd unit of the United States National Park Service under Title VII of the Omnibus Public Land Management Act, which was signed into law on March 30, 2009. The park is located in the city of Monroe in Monroe County, Michigan. It was designated as a Michigan Historic Site on February 18, 1956 and was added to the National Register of Historic Places on December 10, 1982. The house at 1403 East Elm Avenue was added to the National Register listing in 2019. It officially began operation as a national park unit on October 22, 2010.

Background

The area was the site of the costly Battle of Frenchtown, in which 397 Americans were killed and 547 taken prisoner after surrender to the British Army and Native American coalition during the War of 1812. The fighting took place from January 18–23, 1813. The first engagement, sometimes referred to as the First Battle of the River Raisin, was a success for the American forces. Angered by their forced retreat, the British and Native Americans counterattacked the American forces four days later, on January 22, at the same location along the River Raisin. Many of the Americans were inexperienced troops from Kentucky; they were ill-prepared and unable to retreat.

During the Battle of Frenchtown, American brigadier general James Winchester reported that only 33 of his approximate 1,000 men escaped the battlefield. 397 were killed, and 547 were taken prisoner, which marked the deadliest conflict ever on Michigan soil and the worst single defeat the Americans suffered in the entire War of 1812. The day after the battle, dozens of captured Americans too wounded to walk were killed by the Native Americans, mostly Potawatomi, in apparent reprisal for atrocities the Kentuckians had committed against them. This is referred to as the River Raisin Massacre. Prisoners who could walk were marched toward Detroit.

Recent history

The River Raisin Battlefield Site was listed as a Michigan Historic Site on February 18, 1956, although the exact date at which the park was first organized is unknown. The location of the site is bounded by North Dixie Highway, the River Raisin, Detroit Avenue, and Mason Run Creek. The Battle of Frenchtown is so named because it took place in and surrounding the Frenchtown Settlement (1784), on the River Raisin's north bank and within the present-day city limits of Monroe. The area of conflict extended during the three days of battle several miles to the north and south of the current park site. After the battles, Frenchtown was gradually abandoned and the present-day city of Monroe developed from its downtown site 1.5 miles west and on the opposite bank of the River Raisin.  The current park area encompasses some 40 acres (16 ha) of undeveloped land on Monroe's east side approximately one-quarter mile (0.4 km) west of Interstate 75. The area contains houses on the outer fringe along East Elm Avenue, and much of the area is occupied by urban development. The River Raisin Paper Company built a large paper mill on the site around 1911, which operated under multiple owners until 1995.

The site was recognized nationally when it was added to the National Register of Historic Places on December 10, 1982. It was officially listed as the River Raisin Battlefield Site (20MR227). In July 1990, the Monroe County Historic Commission and the Monroe County Historic Society opened the River Raisin Battlefield Visitor Center within the site at 1403 East Elm Avenue. The museum contains a few relics from the original battle that were discovered during archeological investigations. The park holds a memorial service every January to commemorate all the soldiers who fought in the Battle of Frenchtown, including the British and Indian soldiers who were allied against the Americans.

Expansion to the present-day park boundaries commenced in 1995 with closure of the paper mill, at which time the City of Monroe organized efforts to restore the entire battlefield site. The City, Historical Society, and property owner negotiated, acquired and facilitated clean up the former paper mill property and adjacent landfill area for future donation to the park service. In addition they transferred a large expanse of wetlands marsh to the State of Michigan for expansion of the adjacent Sterling State Park. Acquisitions were complete by 2006, the paper mill was demolished by 2009, the cleanup finished in 2010, and land transfers were completed in 2011.

Promotion to the National Park System

The River Raisin Battlefield Site was chosen to be included as a unit of the National Park System. The River Raisin National Battlefield Act (H.R. 401.IH), which was passed by the House of Representatives of the 111th Congress on January 9, 2009, said that the future national battlefield site would include land in both Monroe and Wayne counties that has been deemed significant to the Battle of Frenchtown.

The passing of the Omnibus Public Land Management Act on March 30, 2009, allocated the funding necessary to promote the site to the status of a National Battlefield Park. The park had been authorized as such but was not officially established until this bill was passed. It was included in the bill thanks to the work of Michigan natives and United States senators Carl Levin and Debbie Stabenow, as well as Congressman John Dingell, a history enthusiast. The site is only the fourth National Battlefield Park in the United States National Park System and is the only one commemorating the War of 1812. Battlefields, however, have been designated using various terms, even within the national park system. These include National Battlefield (without "Park" in the name), National Military Park, National Battlefield Site, National Historical Park, National Monument, and National Historic Site. River Raisin is the fifth national park unit in Michigan. Others include Isle Royale National Park, Keweenaw National Historical Park, Pictured Rocks National Lakeshore, and Sleeping Bear Dunes National Lakeshore; Father Marquette National Memorial is an affiliated unit.

The park is still being developed to meet National Park Service standards, with elements dependent on additional funding. The construction of and promotion of a national park typically takes eight years, which includes a variety of steps, such as land acquisition, funding, a management plan, and development of tourism facilities. However, since the county has already preserved and managed the battlefield site, this process took considerably less time. Some areas have yet to be restored to landscapes of the era of the battle.

The battlefield site is expected to generate a positive economic effect in tourism. Projected attendance to the park upon its completion was estimated to range from 20,000 to 25,000 visitors a year, but during FY 2012, the battlefield was visited by 52,027 people. The other three National Battlefield Parks, which all relate to the Civil War, receive more visitors, based on attendance figures from 2005: Kennesaw Mountain National Battlefield Park (1,005,510), Manassas National Battlefield Park (715,622), and Richmond National Battlefield Park (68,438).

In 2010 the battlefield park was connected to the nearby Sterling State Park through a newly completed nature trail, which is expected to increase the number of visitors in both parks. The president of the Monroe County Historical Society, William Braunlich, hoped to complete elements in the park before the bicentennial celebration of the Battle of Frenchtown on January 22, 2013. The site began operations as a national park unit on October 22, 2010.

In 2014, the park expanded by adding a disconnected coastal parcel that includes a historic corduroy road, a remnant of Hull's Trace, a military road that connected Fort Detroit to Ohio. The Hull's Trace Unit at the beginning of West Jefferson Avenue in Brownstown Township, about 13 miles northeast of the battlefield park, had been managed by Wayne County Parks, and is now cooperatively managed by the National Park Service, the county, U.S. Silica, and the Michigan Departments of Natural Resources and Environmental Quality. It is an unstaffed site.

Spurred in part by planned construction of the Gordie Howe International Bridge between Detroit and Windsor, historic Fort Wayne in Detroit was studied in 2017 and 2018 as a possible addition to the national park system, including as a unit of River Raisin National Battlefield Park. The National Park Service had previously assisted in identifying ways to preserve Fort Wayne and draw visitors.

Historic markers

External links

 River Raisin National Battlefield Park, National Park Service

References

Landmarks of the War of 1812
Monroe, Michigan
National Park Service areas in Michigan
Archaeological sites in Michigan
Protected areas established in 2009
Museums in Monroe County, Michigan
Michigan State Historic Sites in Monroe County
Michigan in the War of 1812
Protected areas of Monroe County, Michigan
Military and war museums in Michigan
Museums of the War of 1812
Parks in Michigan
2009 establishments in Michigan
Parks on the National Register of Historic Places in Michigan
National Battlefields and Military Parks of the United States